Guy C. Z. Mhone (1943–2005) was a Zambian-Malawian economist and academic. He is regarded as one of Africa's greatest development economists.

References 

1943 births
2005 deaths
21st-century Malawian economists
Zambian economists
20th-century Malawian economists